The 1978 Jordanian  League (known as The Jordanian  League,   was the 28th season of Jordan League since its inception in 1944.In the 1978 it was called (first division league) Al-Ahli won its 7th title.

Teams

Map

League table 

 Al-Hussein did not relegated because the Football Association decided to increase the number of clubs to 8 teams in the 1979 season.

Overview
Al-Ahli won the championship.

References
RSSSF

External links
 Jordan Football Association website

Jordanian Pro League seasons
Jordan
Jordan
football